The Federal Office for the Protection of the Constitution ( or BfV, often Bundesverfassungsschutz) is Germany's federal domestic intelligence agency. Together with the Landesämter für Verfassungsschutz (LfV) at the state level, the federal agency is tasked with intelligence-gathering on efforts against the liberal democratic basic order, the existence and security of the federation or one of its states, and the peaceful coexistence of peoples; with counter-intelligence; and with protective security and counter-sabotage. The BfV reports to the Federal Ministry of the Interior and tasks and powers are regulated in the Bundesverfassungsschutzgesetz. The President is Thomas Haldenwang; he was appointed in 2018.

Together with the Federal Intelligence Service and the Military Counterintelligence Service, the BfV is one of the three federal intelligence services. 

The BfV investigates efforts and activities directed against the federal level of Germany or transnational, in matters of foreign policy significance and at the request of a state authority for the protection of the constitution.

Overview
The BfV is overseen by the Federal Ministry of the Interior as well as the Bundestag, the Federal Commissioner for Data Protection and Freedom of Information and other federal institutions. The Federal Minister of the Interior has administrative and functional control of the BfV. The BfV is also under judicial control and all its activities can be legally challenged in court. Based on the right of information, the general public can direct inquiries and petitions at the BfV.

Unlike some intelligence agencies of other countries, the agents of the German intelligence services, including the BfV, have no police authority. This is due to the history of abusive police power in previous regimes. In particular, they are not allowed to arrest people and do not carry weapons.

Organization

The BfV is based in Cologne. It is headed by a president (currently Thomas Haldenwang) and two vice-presidents (currently Ernst Stehl and Sinan Selen) and organised in twelve departments:

 Department Z: Central Services
 Department TA: Technical Analysis 
 Department TX: Technical Infrastructure 
 Department C: Cyber Defence
 Department O: Surveillance
 Department S: Internal Security, Protective Security and Counter-sabotage, Supervisory and Advisory Quality Management, Internal Audit
 Department 1: Specialized Support
 Department 2: Right-wing extremism/Terrorism
 Department 3: Measures according to the G-10 act
 Department 4: Counter-espionage,  and Protection Against Industrial Espionage
 Department 5: Extremism of foreigners and Left-wing extremism
 Department 6: Islamic extremism and terrorism
 AfV: Academy of the German Domestic Intelligence Services (including the MAD)
 ZNAF: Education and Training (in cooperation with the BND)

In 2019 federal funding for the BfV was €399 million; with a total of 3,864 staff members employed.

Activities and operations

While the BfV uses all kinds of surveillance technology and infiltration, they mostly use open sources. The BfV publishes a yearly report (Verfassungsschutzbericht) which is intended to raise awareness about anti-constitutional activities.

Main concerns of the BfV are:

 Far-left political extremists, platforms, movements and parties, notably certain factions within Die Linke, as well as other smaller parties and groups promoting communism.
 Far-right political extremists (mainly Neo-Nazis, including the NPD political party, factions within Alternative für Deutschland, and smaller groups preaching Nazism, fascism, racism and xenophobia).
 Extremist organisations of foreigners living in Germany (most prominently Islamist terrorists).
 Cults (Sekten) such as Scientology (considered by the German government an authoritarian, anti-democratic commercial organisation rather than a religion).
 Organised crime is also mentioned as a threat to democracy, law and order, and free enterprise in the country's business economic system. However, organized crime is only marginally, if at all, actively combated by the BfV, as it falls into the responsibility of the normal police, especially the BKA.

Personnel, Recruitment and Training 
The BfV employed civil servants. As in the rest of the federal service, the careers for civil servants are divided into simple, middle, upper and higher service. All employees must go through an extended security check with security investigations before they can work in the BfV. It's the highest security check in Germany. The BfV trains its staff for the middle and higher service itself, together with the BND.

Middle-Service 
For the Middle-Service (Mittlerer Dienst) the training conveys the theoretical knowledge and methods as well as the practical professional knowledge and skills that are required for the fulfillment of the tasks in the middle service in the Federal Office for the Protection of the Constitution. In addition, the training should enable the candidates to act responsibly in a liberal, democratic and social constitutional state. This also includes the ability to recognize and classify potential dangers for the security of the Federal Republic of Germany in a national and international context.

The subject areas of the theoretical training are operational procurement and observation, operational information analysis, state and constitutional law, criminal law, laws on the intelligence services and other laws relating to intelligence services, international politics and forms of political extremism, security fields relating to intelligence services, in particular self-security, Counter-espionage, intelligence-psychology, foreign language training as well as household, cash and accounting. The training takes place at both the ZNAF and the AfV.

Upper-Service 
In a close connection between science and practice, the upper-service conveys the scientific methods and knowledge as well as the practical professional skills and knowledge that are required for the fulfillment of the tasks in the higher service in the federal constitution protection. In addition, it lays the foundation for a cross-agency knowledge and method base. The course is intended to promote cooperation between the intelligence services and contribute to the standardization of intelligence work.

In the basic course, legal, constitutional, political, business, economic, financial and social science fundamentals of administrative action are taught, as well as organization and information processing. Topics of the main course are operational procurement and observation, intelligence service information evaluation, state, administrative, criminal, international and European law, international politics and the history of political ideas as well as forms of political extremism, internal security, counter-espionage, intelligence-psychology, foreign language training and intelligence service relevant topics from business and technology. A thesis has to be written during the preparatory service. The training takes place at both the ZNAF and the AfV.

Higher-Service 
Above all, the BfV offers fully qualified lawyers entry into the higher non-technical administrative service as a junior executive with direct employment as a civil servant.

History
An indirect predecessor of the federal office existed already in the Weimar Republic from 1920 to 1929, the Federal Commissioner for Monitoring of the Public Order.

In the course of drafting the Basic Law for the Federal Republic of Germany the military governors of the Trizone outlined the competences of federal police and intelligence (Polizeibrief of 14 April 1949). In accordance with this outline the BfV was established on 7 November 1950. At first the BfV was mostly concerned with Neo-Nazism and communist revolutionary activities. Soon the BfV also became involved in counter-espionage.

From the beginning, the BfV was troubled by a number of affairs. First, in the Vulkan affair in April 1953, 44 suspects were arrested and charged with spying on behalf of East Germany (GDR), but were later released as the information provided by the BfV was insufficient to obtain court verdicts. Then, in 1954 the first president of the BfV, Otto John, fled to the GDR. Shortly after that it became public that a number of employees of the BfV had been with the Gestapo during the Third Reich. Nevertheless, material on the Communist Party of Germany (KPD) was essential for banning the party by the Federal Constitutional Court of Germany in August 1956. Over the years, a number of associations and political groups were banned on the basis of materials provided by the BfV.

Since 1972 the BfV is also concerned with activities of foreign nationals in Germany, especially extremists and terrorists who operate in the country or plan their activities there, such as the Kurdistan Workers' Party. One of the major intelligence failures in this field were the riots by supporters of the PKK in 1998, which the BfV missed due to the Cologne carnival.

The counter-intelligence activities of the BfV were mostly directed against the East German Ministry for State Security (Stasi), another employer of ex-Gestapo agents. The MfS successfully penetrated the BfV and in a number of affairs destroyed its reputation as a counter-intelligence service by the early 1980s. In this, the MfS profited from the West German border regime which allowed any GDR citizen into the Federal Republic without restrictions.

Criticism
The failure to detect the activities of the 9/11 conspirators in Germany raised questions about the BfV's capability. The rise of right-wing extremism in Germany, especially in the former GDR, was also partly blamed on the failure to establish working structures there.

The agency was heavily criticised for the destruction of files related to the National Socialist Underground, a neo-Nazi terror group. The scandal led to the resignation of BfV president Heinz Fromm in 2012.

Presidents

 Otto John (1 December 1950 – 20 July 1954)
  (Acting) (26 July 1954 – 31 July 1955)
  (1 August 1955 – 30 April 1972)
  (1 May 1972 – 31 August 1975)
  (1 September 1975 – 26 April 1982)
  (13 May 1983 – 31 July 1985)
  (1 August 1985 – 1 April 1987)
  (9 April 1987 – 28 February 1991)
  (28 February 1991 – 27 July 1995)
  (1 August 1995 – 15 May 1996)
  (15 May 1996 – 10 April 2000)
 Heinz Fromm (1 June 2000 – 31 July 2012)
 Hans-Georg Maaßen (1 August 2012 – 8 November 2018)
 Thomas Haldenwang (November 2018 – present)

See also
 List of intelligence agencies of Germany

References

External links
Federal Office for the Protection of the Constitution
Heinz Fromm – The Fighter Against Terrorists, Extremists and Russian Spies

German intelligence agencies
Privacy in Germany
 
Domestic intelligence agencies